In telecommunications, 5G is the fifth-generation technology standard for broadband cellular networks, which cellular phone companies began deploying worldwide in 2019, and is the planned successor to the 4G networks which provide connectivity to most current cellphones.

Like its predecessors, 5G networks are cellular networks, in which the service area is divided into small geographical areas called cells. All 5G wireless devices in a cell are connected to the Internet and telephone network by radio waves through a local antenna in the cell. The new networks have higher download speeds, eventually up to 10 gigabits per second (Gbit/s). In addition to 5G being faster than existing networks, 5G has higher bandwidth and can thus connect more different devices, improving the quality of Internet services in crowded areas. Due to the increased bandwidth, it is expected the networks will increasingly be used as general internet service providers (ISPs) for laptops and desktop computers, competing with existing ISPs such as cable internet, and also will make possible new applications in internet-of-things (IoT) and machine-to-machine areas. Cellphones with 4G capability alone are not able to use the 5G networks.

Overview 
5G networks are cellular networks, in which the service area is divided into small geographical areas called cells. All 5G wireless devices in a cell communicate by radio waves with a cellular base station via fixed antennas, over frequency channels assigned by the base station. The base stations, termed nodes, are connected to switching centers in the telephone network and routers for Internet access by high-bandwidth optical fiber or wireless backhaul connections. As in other cellular networks, a mobile device moving from one cell to another is automatically handed off seamlessly. 5G is expected to support up to a million devices per square kilometer.

The industry consortium setting standards for 5G, the 3rd Generation Partnership Project (3GPP), defines "5G" as any system using 5G NR (5G New Radio) software - a definition that came into general use by late 2018.

Several network operators use millimeter waves called FR2 in 5G terminology, for additional capacity and higher throughputs. Millimeter waves have a shorter range than the lower frequency microwaves, therefore the cells are of a smaller size. Millimeter waves also have more trouble passing through building walls. Millimeter-wave antennas are smaller than the large antennas used in previous cellular networks. Some are only a few centimeters long.

The increased data rate is achieved partly by using additional higher-frequency radio waves in addition to the low- and medium-band frequencies used in previous cellular networks.  For providing a wide range of services, 5G networks can operate in three frequency bands low, medium, and high.

5G can be implemented in low-band, mid-band or high-band millimeter-wave 24 GHz up to 54 GHz. Low-band 5G uses a similar frequency range to 4G cellphones, 600–900 MHz, giving download speeds a little higher than 4G: 30–250 megabits per second (Mbit/s).  Low-band cell towers have a range and coverage area similar to 4G towers.  Mid-band 5G uses microwaves of 1.7–4.7 GHz, allowing speeds of 100–900 Mbit/s, with each cell tower providing service up to several kilometers in radius.  This level of service is the most widely deployed, and was deployed in many metropolitan areas in 2020. Some regions are not implementing the low band, making Mid-band the minimum service level.  High-band 5G uses frequencies of 24–47 GHz, near the bottom of the millimeter wave band, although higher frequencies may be used in the future. It often achieves download speeds in the gigabit-per-second (Gbit/s) range, comparable to cable internet.  However, millimeter waves (mmWave or mmW)  have a more limited range, requiring many small cells. They can be impeded or blocked by materials in walls or windows.
Due to their higher cost, plans are to deploy these cells only in dense urban environments and areas where crowds of people congregate such as sports stadiums and convention centers.  The above speeds are those achieved in actual tests in 2020, and speeds are expected to increase during rollout. 

Rollout of 5G technology has led to debate over its security and relationship with Chinese vendors. It has also been the subject of health concerns and misinformation, including discredited conspiracy theories linking it to the COVID-19 pandemic.

Application areas 
The ITU-R has defined three main application areas for the enhanced capabilities of 5G. They are Enhanced Mobile Broadband (eMBB), Ultra Reliable Low Latency Communications (URLLC), and Massive Machine Type Communications (mMTC). Only eMBB is deployed in 2020; URLLC and mMTC are several years away in most locations.

Enhanced Mobile Broadband (eMBB) uses 5G as a progression from 4G LTE mobile broadband services, with faster connections, higher throughput, and more capacity. This will benefit areas of higher traffic such as stadiums, cities, and concert venues.

Ultra-Reliable Low-Latency Communications (URLLC) refer to using the network for mission critical applications that require uninterrupted and robust data exchange. The short-packet data transmission is used to meet both reliability and latency requirements of the wireless communication networks.

Massive Machine-Type Communications (mMTC) would be used to connect to a large number of devices.  5G technology will connect some of the 50 billion connected IoT devices. Most will use the less expensive Wi-Fi. Drones, transmitting via 4G or 5G, will aid in disaster recovery efforts, providing real-time data for emergency responders. Most cars will have a 4G or 5G cellular connection for many services. Autonomous cars do not require 5G, as they have to be able to operate where they do not have a network connection. However, most autonomous vehicles also feature teleoperations for mission accomplishment, and these greatly benefit from 5G technology.

Performance

Speed 
5G speeds will range from around 50 Mbps to 1,000 Mbps (1 Gbps) depending on the RF channel and base station load. Faster speeds require use of the mmWave bands, reaching 4 Gbps with carrier aggregation and MIMO, assuming a perfect channel and no other base station load.

Sub-6 GHz 5G (mid-band), by far the most common, can deliver between 10 and 1,000 Mbps; it will have a much further reach than mmWave bands. In the sub-6 bands, C-Band (n77/n78) was deployed by various U.S. operators in 2022. C-Band had been planned to be deployed by Verizon and AT&T in early January 2022 but was delayed due to safety concerns raised by the Federal Aviation Administration.

Low bands (such as n5) offer a greater range, thereby a greater coverage area for a given cell, but their speeds are lower than the mid and high bands.

Latency 
In 5G, the ideal "air latency" is of the order of 8 to 12 milliseconds i.e., excluding delays due to HARQ retransmissions, handovers, etc. Retransmission latency and backhaul latency to the server must be added to the "air latency" for correct comparisons. Verizon reported the latency on its 5G early deployment is 30 ms. Edge Servers close to the towers can probably reduce latency to between 10 and 15 milliseconds.

Latency is much higher during handovers; ranging from 50 to 500 milliseconds depending on the type of handover. Reducing handover interruption time is an ongoing area of research and development; options include modifying the handover margin (offset) and the time-to-trigger (TTT).

Error rate 
5G uses adaptive modulation and coding scheme (MCS) to keep the bit error rate (BLER) extremely low. Whenever the error rate crosses a (very low) threshold the transmitter will switch to a lower MCS, which will be less error-prone. This way speed is sacrificed to ensure an almost zero error rate.

Range 
The range of 5G depends on many factors: transmit power, frequency, and interference. For example, mmWave (e.g.:band n258) will have a lower range than mid-band (e.g.: band n78) which will have a lower range than low-band (e.g.: band n5)

Given the marketing hype on what 5G can offer, simulators and drive tests are used by cellular service providers for the precise measurement of 5G performance.

Standards 
Initially, the term was associated with the International Telecommunication Union's IMT-2020 standard, which required a theoretical peak download speed of 20 gigabits per second and 10 gigabits per second upload speed, along with other requirements. Then, the industry standards group 3GPP chose the 5G NR (New Radio) standard together with LTE as their proposal for submission to the IMT-2020 standard.

5G NR can include lower frequencies (FR1), below 6 GHz, and higher frequencies (FR2), above 24 GHz. However, the speed and latency in early FR1 deployments, using 5G NR software on 4G hardware (non-standalone), are only slightly better than new 4G systems, estimated at 15 to 50% better.

The standard documents for 5G are organized by 3GPP.

The 5G system architecture is defined in TS 23.501. The packet protocol for mobility management (establishing connection and moving between base stations) and session management (connecting to networks and network slices) is described in TS 24.501. Specifications of key data structures are found in TS 23.003.

Fronthaul network 
IEEE covers several areas of 5G with a core focus in wireline sections between the Remote Radio Head (RRH) and Base Band Unit (BBU). The 1914.1 standards focus on network architecture and dividing the connection between the RRU and BBU into two key sections. Radio Unit (RU) to the Distributor Unit (DU) being the NGFI-I (Next Generation Fronthaul Interface) and the DU to the Central Unit (CU) being the NGFI-II interface allowing a more diverse and cost-effective network. NGFI-I and NGFI-II have defined performance values which should be compiled to ensure different traffic types defined by the ITU are capable of being carried.  The IEEE 1914.3 standard is creating a new Ethernet frame format capable of carrying IQ data in a much more efficient way depending on the functional split utilized. This is based on the 3GPP definition of functional splits.

5G NR 

5G NR (New Radio) is the primary air interface developed for 5G networks. It is the global standard for 3GPP 5G networks.

5Gi 
5Gi is an alternative 5G variant developed in India. It was developed in a joint collaboration between IIT Madras, IIT Hyderabad, TSDSI, and the Centre of Excellence in Wireless Technology (CEWiT). 5Gi (also known as Radio Interface Technology or RIT) is designed to improve 5G coverage in rural and remote areas over different geographical terrains. 5Gi uses Low Mobility Large Cell (LMLC) to extend 5G connectivity and the range of a base station.

Pre-standard implementations 
 5G TF: The 5G network implemented by American carrier Verizon for Fixed Wireless Access in late 2010s uses a pre-standard specification known as 5G TF (Verizon 5G Technical Forum). The 5G service provided to customers in this standard is incompatible with 5G NR. Verizon has since migrated to 5G NR.
 5G-SIG: Pre-standard specification of 5G developed by KT Corporation. Deployed at Pyeongchang 2018 Winter Olympics.

Internet of things 
In the Internet of things (IoT), 3GPP is going to submit evolution of NB-IoT and eMTC (LTE-M) as 5G technologies for the LPWA (Low Power Wide Area) use case.

Deployment 

Beyond mobile operator networks, 5G is also expected to be used for private networks with applications in industrial IoT, enterprise networking, and critical communications, in what being described as NR-U (5G NR in Unlicensed Spectrum)

Initial 5G NR launches depended on pairing with existing LTE (4G) infrastructure in non-standalone (NSA) mode (5G NR radio with 4G core), before maturation of the standalone (SA) mode with the 5G core network.

As of April 2019, the Global Mobile Suppliers Association had identified 224 operators in 88 countries that have demonstrated, are testing or trialing, or have been licensed to conduct field trials of 5G technologies, are deploying 5G networks or have announced service launches. The equivalent numbers in November 2018 were 192 operators in 81 countries. The first country to adopt 5G on a large scale was South Korea, in April 2019. Swedish telecoms giant Ericsson predicted that 5G internet will cover up to 65% of the world's population by the end of 2025. Also, it plans to invest 1 billion reals ($238.30 million) in Brazil to add a new assembly line dedicated to fifth-generation technology (5G) for its Latin American operations.

When South Korea launched its 5G network, all carriers used Samsung, Ericsson, and Nokia base stations and equipment, except for LG U Plus, who also used Huawei equipment. Samsung was the largest supplier for 5G base stations in South Korea at launch, having shipped 53,000 base stations at the time, out of 86,000 base stations installed across the country at the time.

The first fairly substantial deployments were in April 2019. In South Korea, SK Telecom claimed 38,000 base stations, KT Corporation 30,000 and LG U Plus 18,000; of which 85% are in six major cities. They are using 3.5 GHz (sub-6) spectrum in non-standalone (NSA) mode and tested speeds were from 193 to 430 Mbit/s down. 260,000 signed up in the first month and 4.7 million by the end of 2019. T-Mobile US was the 1st company in the world to launch a commercially available 5G NR Standalone network.

Nine companies sell 5G radio hardware and 5G systems for carriers: Altiostar, Cisco Systems, Datang Telecom/Fiberhome, Ericsson, Huawei, Nokia, Qualcomm, Samsung, and ZTE.

Spectrum 
Large quantities of new radio spectrum (5G NR frequency bands) have been allocated to 5G. For example, in July 2016, the U.S. Federal Communications Commission (FCC) freed up vast amounts of bandwidth in underused high-band spectrum for 5G. The Spectrum Frontiers Proposal (SFP) doubled the amount of millimeter-wave unlicensed spectrum to 14 GHz and created four times the amount of flexible, mobile-use spectrum the FCC had licensed to date. In March 2018, European Union lawmakers agreed to open up the 3.6 and 26 GHz bands by 2020.

, there are reportedly 52 countries, territories, special administrative regions, disputed territories and dependencies that are formally considering introducing certain spectrum bands for terrestrial 5G services, are holding consultations regarding suitable spectrum allocations for 5G, have reserved spectrum for 5G, have announced plans to auction frequencies or have already allocated spectrum for 5G use.

5G devices 
In March 2019, the Global Mobile Suppliers Association released the industry's first database tracking worldwide 5G device launches. In it, the GSA identified 23 vendors who have confirmed the availability of forthcoming 5G devices with 33 different devices including regional variants. There were seven announced 5G device form factors: (telephones (×12 devices), hotspots (×4), indoor and outdoor customer-premises equipment (×8), modules (×5), Snap-on dongles and adapters (×2), and USB terminals (×1)). By October 2019, the number of announced 5G devices had risen to 129, across 15 form factors, from 56 vendors.

In the 5G IoT chipset arena, as of April 2019 there were four commercial 5G modem chipsets and one commercial processor/platform, with more launches expected in the near future.

On March 4, 2019, the first-ever all-5G smartphone Samsung Galaxy S10+ 5G was released. According to Business Insider, the 5G feature was showcased as more expensive in comparison with 4G; the line up starts at US$1,000, in comparison with Samsung Galaxy S10e which started at US$750. On March 19, HMD Global, the current maker of Nokia-branded phones, announced the Nokia 8.3 5G, which it claimed as having a wider range of 5G compatibility than any other phone released to that time. The mid-range model, with an initial Eurozone price of €599, is claimed to support all 5G bands from 600 MHz to 3.8 GHz.

Many phone manufacturers support 5G. Apple iPhone 12 and later models support 5G. Google Pixel devices also support 5G, starting with the Pixel 5 and 4a 5G.

Technology

New radio frequencies 

The air interface defined by 3GPP for 5G is known as New Radio (NR), and the specification is subdivided into two frequency bands, FR1 (below 6 GHz) and FR2 (24–54 GHz)

Frequency range 1 (< 6 GHz) 
Otherwise known as sub-6, the maximum channel bandwidth defined for FR1 is 100 MHz, due to the scarcity of continuous spectrum in this crowded frequency range. The band most widely being used for 5G in this range is 3.3–4.2 GHz. The Korean carriers use the n78 band at 3.5 GHz.

Some parties used the term "mid-band" frequency to refer to higher part of this frequency range that was not used in previous generations of mobile communication.

Frequency range 2 (24–71 GHz) 
The minimum channel bandwidth defined for FR2 is 50 MHz and the maximum is 400 MHz, with two-channel aggregation supported in 3GPP Release 15. The higher the frequency, the greater the ability to support high data-transfer speeds. Signals in this frequency range with wavelengths between 4 and 12 mm are called millimeter waves.

FR2 coverage 
5G in the 24 GHz range or above use higher frequencies than 4G, and as a result, some 5G signals are not capable of traveling large distances (over a few hundred meters), unlike 4G or lower frequency 5G signals (sub 6 GHz). This requires placing 5G base stations every few hundred meters in order to use higher frequency bands. Also, these higher frequency 5G signals cannot penetrate solid objects easily, such as cars, trees, walls, and even humans, because of the nature of these higher frequency electromagnetic waves. 5G cells can be deliberately designed to be as inconspicuous as possible, which finds applications in places like restaurants and shopping malls.

Massive MIMO 

MIMO systems use multiple antennas at the transmitter and receiver ends of a wireless communication system.  Multiple antennas use the spatial dimension for multiplexing in addition to the time and frequency ones, without changing the bandwidth requirements of the system.

Massive MIMO (multiple-input and multiple-output) antennas increases sector throughput and capacity density using large numbers of antennas. This includes Single User MIMO and Multi-user MIMO (MU-MIMO). 

In general, more antennas equal better performance. But more antennas also require bigger arrays that draw more power. Some of the places service providers deploy radio links have very tight constraints, so finding the right solution means weighing tradeoffs. For in-building coverage, the performance gain is often worth it. For outdoor or street-level coverage, maybe not.

Edge computing 

Edge computing is delivered by computing servers closer to the ultimate user. It reduces latency, data traffic congestion and can improve service availability.

Small cell 

Small cells are low-powered cellular radio access nodes that operate in licensed and unlicensed spectrum that have a range of 10 meters to a few kilometers. Small cells are critical to 5G networks, as 5G's radio waves can't travel long distances, because of 5G's higher frequencies.

Beamforming 

 5G uses both digital and analog beamforming to improve the system capacity.

Convergence of Wi-Fi and cellular 
One expected benefit of the transition to 5G is the convergence of multiple networking functions to achieve cost, power, and complexity reductions. LTE has targeted convergence with Wi-Fi band/technology via various efforts, such as License Assisted Access (LAA; 5G signal in unlicensed frequency bands that are also used by Wi-Fi) and LTE-WLAN Aggregation (LWA; convergence with Wi-Fi Radio), but the differing capabilities of cellular and Wi-Fi have limited the scope of convergence. However, significant improvement in cellular performance specifications in 5G, combined with migration from Distributed Radio Access Network (D-RAN) to Cloud- or Centralized-RAN (C-RAN) and rollout of cellular small cells can potentially narrow the gap between Wi-Fi and cellular networks in dense and indoor deployments. Radio convergence could result in sharing ranging from the aggregation of cellular and Wi-Fi channels to the use of a single silicon device for multiple radio access technologies.

NOMA (non-orthogonal multiple access)

SDN/NFV 

Initially, cellular mobile communications technologies were designed in the context of providing voice services and Internet access. Today a new era of innovative tools and technologies is inclined towards developing a new pool of applications. This pool of applications consists of different domains such as the Internet of Things (IoT), web of connected autonomous vehicles, remotely controlled robots, and heterogeneous sensors connected to serve versatile applications. In this context, network slicing has emerged as a key technology to efficiently embrace this new market model.

Channel coding 
The channel coding techniques for 5G NR have changed from Turbo codes in 4G to polar codes for the control channels and LDPC (low-density parity check codes) for the data channels.

Operation in unlicensed spectrum 
In December 2018, 3GPP began working on unlicensed spectrum specifications known as 5G NR-U, targeting 3GPP Release 16. Qualcomm has made a similar proposal for LTE in unlicensed spectrum.

Future evolution

5G-Advanced 

Concerns

Security concerns 

A report published by the European Commission and European Agency for Cybersecurity details the security issues surrounding 5G. The report warns against using a single supplier for a carrier's 5G infrastructure, especially those based outside the European Union. (Nokia and Ericsson are the only European manufacturers of 5G equipment.)

On October 18, 2018, a team of researchers from ETH Zurich, the University of Lorraine and the University of Dundee released a paper entitled, "A Formal Analysis of 5G Authentication". It alerted that 5G technology could open ground for a new era of security threats. The paper described the technology as "immature and insufficiently tested," and one that "enables the movement and access of vastly higher quantities of data, and thus broadens attack surfaces". Simultaneously, network security companies such as Fortinet, Arbor Networks, A10 Networks, and Voxility advised on personalized and mixed security deployments against massive DDoS attacks foreseen after 5G deployment.

IoT Analytics estimated an increase in the number of IoT devices, enabled by 5G technology, from 7 billion in 2018 to 21.5 billion by 2025. This can raise the attack surface for these devices to a substantial scale, and the capacity for DDoS attacks, cryptojacking, and other cyberattacks could boost proportionally. In addition, the EPS solution for 5G networks has identified a design vulnerability. The vulnerability affects the operation of the device during cellular network switching.

Due to fears of potential espionage of users of Chinese equipment vendors, several countries (including the United States, Australia and the United Kingdom as of early 2019) have taken actions to restrict or eliminate the use of Chinese equipment in their respective 5G networks. A 2012 U.S. House Permanent Select Committee on Intelligence report concluded that using equipment made by Huawei and ZTE, another Chinese telecommunications company, could "undermine core U.S. national security interests". In 2018, six U.S. intelligence chiefs, including the directors of the CIA and FBI, cautioned Americans against using Huawei products, warning that the company could conduct "undetected espionage". Further, a 2017 investigation by the FBI determined that Chinese-made Huawei equipment could disrupt U.S. nuclear arsenal communications. Chinese vendors and the Chinese government have denied claims of espionage, but experts have pointed out that Huawei would have no choice but to hand over network data to the Chinese government if Beijing asked for it because of Chinese National Security Law. 

In August, 2020, the U.S. State Department launched "The Clean Network" as a U.S. government-led, bi-partisan effort to address what it described as "the long-term threat to data privacy, security, human rights and principled collaboration posed to the free world from authoritarian malign actors". Promoters of the initiative have stated that it has resulted in an "alliance of democracies and companies", "based on democratic values". On October 7, 2020, the UK Parliament's Defence Committee released a report claiming that there was clear evidence of collusion between Huawei and Chinese state and the Chinese Communist Party. The UK Parliament's Defence Committee said that the government should consider removal of all Huawei equipment from its 5G networks earlier than planned. In December 2020, the United States announced that more than 60 nations, representing more than two thirds of the world's gross domestic product, and 200 telecom companies, had publicly committed to the principles of The Clean Network. This alliance of democracies included 27 of the 30 NATO members; 26 of the 27 EU members, 31 of the 37 OECD nations, 11 of the 12 Three Seas nations as well as Japan, Israel, Australia, Singapore, Taiwan, Canada, Vietnam, and India.

Electromagnetic interference

Weather forecasting 

The spectrum used by various 5G proposals, especially the n258 band centered at 26 GHz, will be near that of passive remote sensing such as by weather and Earth observation satellites, particularly for water vapor monitoring at 23.8 GHz. Interference is expected to occur due to such proximity and its effect could be significant without effective controls. An increase in interference already occurred with some other prior proximate band usages. Interference to satellite operations impairs numerical weather prediction performance with substantially deleterious economic and public safety impacts in areas such as commercial aviation.

The concerns prompted U.S. Secretary of Commerce Wilbur Ross and NASA Administrator Jim Bridenstine in February 2019 to urge the FCC to delay some spectrum auction proposals, which was rejected. The chairs of the House Appropriations Committee and House Science Committee wrote separate letters to FCC chairman Ajit Pai asking for further review and consultation with NOAA, NASA, and DoD, and warning of harmful impacts to national security. Acting NOAA director Neil Jacobs testified before the House Committee in May 2019 that 5G out-of-band emissions could produce a 30% reduction in weather forecast accuracy and that the resulting degradation in ECMWF model performance would have resulted in failure to predict the track and thus the impact of Superstorm Sandy in 2012. The United States Navy in March 2019 wrote a memorandum warning of deterioration and made technical suggestions to control band bleed-over limits, for testing and fielding, and for coordination of the wireless industry and regulators with weather forecasting organizations. 

At the 2019 quadrennial World Radiocommunication Conference (WRC), atmospheric scientists advocated for a strong buffer of −55 dBW, European regulators agreed on a recommendation of −42 dBW, and US regulators (the FCC) recommended a restriction of −20 dBW, which would permit signals 150 times stronger than the European proposal. The ITU decided on an intermediate −33 dBW until September 1, 2027, and after that a standard of −39 dBW. This is closer to the European recommendation but even the delayed higher standard is much weaker than that requested by atmospheric scientists, triggering warnings from the World Meteorological Organization (WMO) that the ITU standard, at 10 times less stringent than its recommendation, brings the "potential to significantly degrade the accuracy of data collected". A representative of the American Meteorological Society (AMS) also warned of interference, and the European Centre for Medium-Range Weather Forecasts (ECMWF), sternly warned, saying that society risks "history repeat[ing] itself" by ignoring atmospheric scientists' warnings (referencing global warming, monitoring of which could be imperiled). In December 2019, a bipartisan request was sent from the US House Science Committee to the Government Accountability Office (GAO) to investigate why there is such a discrepancy between recommendations of US civilian and military science agencies and the regulator, the FCC.

Aviation 
The United States FAA has warned that radar altimeters on aircraft, which operate between 4.2 and 4.4 GHz, might be affected by 5G operations between 3.7 and 3.98 GHz. This is particularly an issue with older altimeters using RF filters which lack protection from neighboring bands. This is not as much of an issue in Europe, where 5G uses lower frequencies between 3.4 and 3.8 GHz. Nonetheless, the DGAC in France has also expressed similar worries and recommended 5G phones be turned off or be put in airplane mode during flights.

On December 31, 2021, U.S. Transportation Secretary Pete Buttigieg and Steve Dickinson, administrator of the Federal Aviation Administration asked the chief executives of AT&T and Verizon to delay 5G implementation over aviation concerns. The government officials asked for a two-week delay starting on January 5, 2022, while investigations are conducted on the effects on radar altimeters. The government transportation officials also asked the cellular providers to hold off their new 5G service near 50 priority airports, to minimize disruption to air traffic that would be caused by some planes being disallowed from landing in poor visibility. After coming to an agreement with government officials the day before, Verizon and AT&T activated their 5G networks on January 19, 2022, except for certain towers near 50 airports. AT&T scaled back its deployment even further than its agreement with the FAA required.

The FAA rushed to test and certify radar altimeters for interference so that planes could be allowed to perform instrument landings (e.g. at night and in low visibility) at affected airports. By January 16, it had certified equipment on 45% of the U.S. fleet, and 78% by January 20. Airlines complained about the avoidable impact on their operations, and commentators said the affair called into question the competence of the FAA. Several international airlines substituted different planes so they could avoid problems landing at scheduled airports, and about 2% of flights (320) were cancelled by the evening of January 19.

Satellite 
A number of 5G networks deployed on the radio frequency band of 3.3–3.6 GHz is expected to cause interference with C-Band satellite stations, which operate by receiving satellite signals at 3.4–4.2 GHz frequency. This interference can be mitigated with low-noise block downconverters and waveguide filters.

Wi-Fi 
In regions like the US and EU, the 6 GHz band is to be opened up for unlicensed applications, which would permit the deployment of 5G-NR Unlicensed, 5G version of LTE in unlicensed spectrum, as well as Wi-Fi 6e. However, interference could occur with the co-existence of different standards in the frequency band.

Overhype
There have been concerns surrounding the promotion of 5G, questioning whether the technology is overhyped. There are questions on whether 5G will truly change the customer experience, ability for 5G's mmWave signal to provide significant coverage, overstating what 5G can achieve or misattributing continuous technological improvement to "5G", lack of new use case for carriers to profit from, wrong focus on emphasizing direct benefits on individual consumers instead of for internet of things devices or solving the last mile problem, and overshadowing the possibility that in some aspects there might be other more appropriate technologies. Such sort of concerns have also led to consumers not trusting information provided by cellular providers on the topic.

Misinformation and controversy

Health 

There is a long history of fear and anxiety surrounding wireless signals that predates 5G technology. The fears about 5G are similar to those that have persisted throughout the 1990s and 2000s. They center on fringe claims that non-ionizing radiation poses dangers to human health. Unlike ionizing radiation, non-ionizing radiation cannot remove electrons from atoms. The CDC says "Exposure to intense, direct amounts of non-ionizing radiation may result in damage to tissue due to heat. This is not common and mainly of concern in the workplace for those who work on large sources of non-ionizing radiation devices and instruments." Some advocates of fringe health claim the regulatory standards are too low and influenced by lobbying groups.

Many popular books of dubious merit have been published on the subject including one by Joseph Mercola alleging that wireless technologies caused numerous conditions from ADHD to heart diseases and brain cancer. Mercola has drawn sharp criticism for his anti-vaccinationism during the COVID-19 pandemic and was warned by the FDA to stop selling fake COVID-19 cures through his online alternative medicine business.

According to the New York Times, one origin of the 5G health controversy was an erroneous unpublished study that physicist Bill P. Curry did for the Broward County School Board in 2000 which indicated that the absorption of external microwaves by brain tissue increased with frequency.  According to experts this was wrong, the millimeter waves used in 5G are safer than lower frequency microwaves because they cannot penetrate the skin and reach internal organs. Curry had confused in vitro and in vivo research.  However Curry's study was widely distributed on the internet. Writing in The New York Times in 2019, William Broad reported that RT America began airing programming linking 5G to harmful health effects which "lack scientific support", such as "brain cancer, infertility, autism, heart tumors, and Alzheimer's disease". Broad asserted that the claims had increased. RT America had run seven programs on this theme by mid-April 2019 but only one in the whole of 2018. The network's coverage had spread to hundreds of blogs and websites.

In April 2019, the city of Brussels in Belgium blocked a 5G trial because of radiation rules. In Geneva, Switzerland, a planned upgrade to 5G was stopped for the same reason. The Swiss Telecommunications Association (ASUT) has said that studies have been unable to show that 5G frequencies have any health impact.

According to CNET, "Members of Parliament in the Netherlands are also calling on the government to take a closer look at 5G. Several leaders in the United States Congress have written to the Federal Communications Commission expressing concern about potential health risks. In Mill Valley, California, the city council blocked the deployment of new 5G wireless cells." Similar concerns were raised in Vermont and New Hampshire. The US FDA is quoted saying that it "continues to believe that the current safety limits for cellphone radiofrequency energy exposure remain acceptable for protecting the public health." After campaigning by activist groups, a series of small localities in the UK, including Totnes, Brighton and Hove, Glastonbury, and Frome, passed resolutions against the implementation of further 5G infrastructure, though these resolutions have no impact on rollout plans.

Low-level EMF does have some effects on other organisms. Vian et al., 2006 finds an effect of microwave on gene expression in plants.A meta-study of 95 in vitro and in vivo studies showed that an average of 80% of the in vivo research showed effects of such radiation, as did 58% of the in vitro research, but that the results were inconclusive as to whether any of these effects pose a health risk.

COVID-19 conspiracy theories and arson attacks 

As the introduction of 5G technology coincided with the time of COVID-19 pandemic, several conspiracy theories circulating online posited a link between COVID-19 and 5G. This has led to dozens of arson attacks being made on telecom masts in the Netherlands (Amsterdam, Rotterdam, etc.), Ireland (Cork, etc.), Cyprus, the United Kingdom (Dagenham, Huddersfield, Birmingham, Belfast and Liverpool), Belgium (Pelt), Italy (Maddaloni), Croatia (Bibinje) and Sweden. It led to at least 61 suspected arson attacks against telephone masts in the United Kingdom alone and over twenty in The Netherlands.

In the early months of the pandemic, anti-lockdown protesters at protests over responses to the COVID-19 pandemic in Australia were seen with anti-5G signs, an early sign of what became a wider campaign by conspiracy theorists to link the pandemic with 5G technology. There are two versions of the 5G-COVID-19 conspiracy theory:

The first version claims that radiation weakens the immune system, making the body more vulnerable to SARS-CoV-2 (the virus that causes COVID-19).
The second version claims that 5G causes COVID-19. There are different variations on this. Some claim that the pandemic is coverup of illness caused by 5G radiation or that COVID-19 originated in Wuhan because that city was "the guinea-pig city for 5G".

Marketing of non-5G services 

In various parts of the world, carriers have launched numerous differently branded technologies, such as "5G Evolution", which advertise improving existing networks with the use of "5G technology". However, these pre-5G networks are an improvement on specifications of existing LTE networks that are not exclusive to 5G. While the technology promises to deliver higher speeds, and is described by AT&T as a "foundation for our evolution to 5G while the 5G standards are being finalized," it cannot be considered to be true 5G. When AT&T announced 5G Evolution, 4x4 MIMO, the technology that AT&T is using to deliver the higher speeds, had already been put in place by T-Mobile without being branded with the 5G moniker. It is claimed that such branding is a marketing move that will cause confusion with consumers, as it is not made clear that such improvements are not true 5G.

History 

 In April 2008, NASA partnered with Geoff Brown and Machine-to-Machine Intelligence (M2Mi) Corp to develop a fifth generation communications technology approach, though largely concerned with working with nanosats. 
 In 2008, the South Korean IT R&D program of "5G mobile communication systems based on beam-division multiple access and relays with group cooperation" was formed. 
 In August 2012, New York University founded NYU Wireless, a multi-disciplinary academic research centre that has conducted pioneering work in 5G wireless communications. 
 On October 8, 2012, the UK's University of Surrey secured £35M for a new 5G research centre, jointly funded by the British government's UK Research Partnership Investment Fund (UKRPIF) and a consortium of key international mobile operators and infrastructure providers, including Huawei, Samsung, Telefónica Europe, Fujitsu Laboratories Europe, Rohde & Schwarz, and Aircom International. It will offer testing facilities to mobile operators keen to develop a mobile standard that uses less energy and less radio spectrum, while delivering speeds higher than current 4G with aspirations for the new technology to be ready within a decade. 
 On November 1, 2012, the EU project "Mobile and wireless communications Enablers for the Twenty-twenty Information Society" (METIS) starts its activity toward the definition of 5G. METIS achieved an early global consensus on these systems. In this sense, METIS played an important role of building consensus among other external major stakeholders prior to global standardization activities. This was done by initiating and addressing work in relevant global fora (e.g. ITU-R), as well as in national and regional regulatory bodies. 
 Also in November 2012, the iJOIN EU project was launched, focusing on "small cell" technology, which is of key importance for taking advantage of limited and strategic resources, such as the radio wave spectrum. According to Günther Oettinger, the European Commissioner for Digital Economy and Society (2014–2019), "an innovative utilization of spectrum" is one of the key factors at the heart of 5G success. Oettinger further described it as "the essential resource for the wireless connectivity of which 5G will be the main driver". iJOIN was selected by the European Commission as one of the pioneering 5G research projects to showcase early results on this technology at the Mobile World Congress 2015 (Barcelona, Spain). 
 In February 2013, ITU-R Working Party 5D (WP 5D) started two study items: (1) Study on IMT Vision for 2020 and beyond, and; (2) Study on future technology trends for terrestrial IMT systems. Both aiming at having a better understanding of future technical aspects of mobile communications toward the definition of the next generation mobile. 
 On May 12, 2013, Samsung Electronics stated that they had developed a "5G" system. The core technology has a maximum speed of tens of Gbit/s (gigabits per second). In testing, the transfer speeds for the "5G" network sent data at 1.056 Gbit/s to a distance of up to 2 kilometers with the use of an 8*8 MIMO. 
 In July 2013, India and Israel agreed to work jointly on development of fifth generation (5G) telecom technologies. 
 On October 1, 2013, NTT (Nippon Telegraph and Telephone), the same company to launch world's first 5G network in Japan, wins Minister of Internal Affairs and Communications Award at CEATEC for 5G R&D efforts. 
 On November 6, 2013, Huawei announced plans to invest a minimum of $600 million into R&D for next generation 5G networks capable of speeds 100 times higher than modern LTE networks.
 On April 3, 2019, South Korea became the first country to adopt 5G. Just hours later, Verizon launched its 5G services in the United States, and disputed South Korea's claim of becoming the world's first country with a 5G network, because allegedly, South Korea's 5G service was launched initially for just six South Korean celebrities so that South Korea could claim the title of having the world's first 5G network. In fact, the three main South Korean telecommunication companies (SK Telecom, KT, and LG Uplus) added more than 40,000 users to their 5G network on the launch day. 
 In June 2019, the Philippines became the first country in Southeast Asia to roll out a 5G network after Globe Telecom commercially launched its 5G data plans to customers. AT&T brings 5G service to consumers and businesses in December 2019 ahead of plans to offer 5G throughout the United States in the first half of 2020.

Other applications

Automobiles 
5G Automotive Association have been promoting the C-V2X communication technology that will first be deployed in 4G. It provides for communication between vehicles and infrastructures.

Digital Twins 
A real time digital twin of the real object such as a turbine engine, aircraft, wind turbines, offshore platform and pipelines. 5G networks helps in building it due to the latency and throughput to capture near real-time IoT data and support digital twins.

Public safety 
Mission-critical push-to-talk (MCPTT) and mission-critical video and data are expected to be furthered in 5G.

Fixed wireless 
Fixed wireless connections will offer an alternative to fixed line broadband (ADSL, VDSL, Fiber optic, and DOCSIS connections) in some locations.

Wireless video transmission for broadcast applications 
Sony has tested the possibility of using local 5G networks to replace the SDI cables currently used in broadcast camcorders.

The 5G Broadcast tests started around 2020 (Orkneys, Bavaria, Austria, Central Bohemia) based on FeMBMS (Further evolved multimedia broadcast multicast service). The aim is to serve unlimited number of mobile or fixed devices with video (TV) and audio (radio) streams without these consuming any data flow or even being authenticated in a network.

See also 
 1G
 2G
 3G
 4G
 5G wireless power
 6G
 Wireless device radiation and health

References

External links 
 

5G (telecommunication)
Technology forecasting
Mobile telecommunications
Internet of things
Computer-related introductions in 2018
Data centers
Wireless communication systems